The 2013 China Open is a top level badminton competition which took place on November 12–17, 2013 in Shanghai, China. It was the eleventh BWF Super Series competition on the 2013 BWF Super Series schedule. The total purse for the event is $450,000. A qualification round was held for three of the five disciplines.

Men's singles

Seeds

  Lee Chong Wei
  Chen Long
  Du Pengyu
  Kenichi Tago
  Tommy Sugiarto
  Nguyen Tien Minh
  Jan Ø. Jørgensen
  Boonsak Ponsana

Top half

Bottom half

Finals

Women's singles

Seeds

  Li Xuerui
  Ratchanok Intanon
  Wang Yihan
  Sung Ji-hyun
  Juliane Schenk
  Saina Nehwal
  Wang Shixian
  Tai Tzu-ying

Top half

Bottom half

Finals

Men's doubles

Seeds

  Muhammad Ahsan / Hendra Setiawan
  Mathias Boe / Carsten Mogensen
  Hiroyuki Endo / Kenichi Hayakawa
  Liu Xiaolong / Qiu Zihan
  Koo Kien Keat / Tan Boon Heong
  Kim Ki-jung / Kim S-r
  Lee Sheng-mu / Tsai Chia-hsin
  Angga Pratama / Ryan Agung Saputro

Top half

Bottom half

Finals

Women's doubles

Seeds

  Wang Xiaoli / Yu Yang
  Christinna Pedersen / Kamilla Rytter Juhl
  Ma Jin / Tang Jinhua
  Misaki Matsutomo / Ayaka Takahashi
  Tian Qing / Zhao Yunlei
  Jung Kyung-eun / Kim Ha-na
  Pia Zebadiah Bernadeth / Rizki Amelia Pradipta
  Bao Yixin / Zhong Qianxin

Top half

Bottom half

Finals

Mixed doubles

Seeds

  Zhang Nan / Zhao Yunlei
  Tantowi Ahmad / Lilyana Natsir
  Xu Chen / Ma Jin
  Joachim Fischer Nielsen / Christinna Pedersen
  Chan Peng Soon / Goh Liu Ying
  Sudket Prapakamol / Saralee Thoungthongkam
  Markis Kido / Pia Zebadiah Bernadeth
  Praveen Jordan / Vita Marissa

Top half

Bottom half

Finals

References

China
China Open (badminton)
Open Super Series Premier